Bob Emerick (February 21, 1913 – September 28, 2003) was an American football player who spent two years in the National Football League.

References 

1910s births
2003 deaths
American football guards
American football tackles
Detroit Lions players
Cleveland Rams players
Miami RedHawks football players